People and Places is a Canadian children's television series which aired on CBC Television from 1961 to 1962.

Premise
The series featured film and studio segments for children on topics such as camping, geography, puppets and writing.

Scheduling
This 15-minute series was broadcast Thursdays at 3:30 a.m. (Eastern) from 5 October to 28 December 1961. Some episodes were rebroadcast in October 1962.

References

External links
 

CBC Television original programming
1961 Canadian television series debuts
1962 Canadian television series endings